

Events

Pre-1600
74 BC – A group of officials, led by the Western Han minister Huo Guang, present articles of impeachment against the new emperor, Liu He, to the imperial regent, Empress Dowager Shangguan. The articles, enumerating the 1,127 offences (sexual debauchery, fiscal negligence, cronyism, etc.) that the ministers found the new emperor to have committed over the course of his 27-day rule, result in the unprecedented impeachment — and summary deposition on the same day — of the emperor by the bureaucracy.
29 BC – Octavian holds the second of three consecutive triumphs in Rome to celebrate the victory over the Dalmatian tribes.
1040 – King Duncan I is killed in battle against his first cousin and rival Macbeth. The latter succeeds him as King of Scotland.
1183 – Taira no Munemori and the Taira clan take the young Emperor Antoku and the three sacred treasures and flee to western Japan to escape pursuit by the Minamoto clan.
1264 – After tricking the Venetian galley fleet into sailing east to the Levant, the Genoese capture an entire Venetian trade convoy at the Battle of Saseno.
1352 – War of the Breton Succession: Anglo-Bretons defeat the French in the Battle of Mauron.
1370 – Charles IV, Holy Roman Emperor, grants city privileges to Karlovy Vary.
1385 – Portuguese Crisis of 1383–85: Battle of Aljubarrota: Portuguese forces commanded by John I of Portugal defeat the Castilian army of John I of Castile.
1592 – The first sighting of the Falkland Islands by John Davis.
1598 – Nine Years' War: Battle of the Yellow Ford: Irish forces under Hugh O'Neill, Earl of Tyrone, defeat an English expeditionary force under Henry Bagenal.

1601–1900
1720 – The Spanish military Villasur expedition is defeated by Pawnee and Otoe warriors near present-day Columbus, Nebraska.
1784 – Russian colonization of North America: Awa’uq Massacre: The Russian fur trader Grigory Shelikhov storms a Kodiak Island Alutiit refuge rock on Sitkalidak Island, killing 500+ Alutiit. The consequent subjugation of the Alutiiq on Kodiak Island allows Shelikhov to establish the first permanent Russian settlement in Alaska at Three Saints Bay.
1790 – The Treaty of Wereloe ended the 1788–1790 Russo-Swedish War.
1791 – Slaves from plantations in Saint-Domingue hold a Vodou ceremony led by houngan Dutty Boukman at Bois Caïman, marking the start of the Haitian Revolution.
1814 –  A cease fire agreement, called the Convention of Moss, ended the Swedish–Norwegian War.
1816 – The United Kingdom formally annexes the Tristan da Cunha archipelago, administering the islands from the Cape Colony in South Africa.
1842 – American Indian Wars: Second Seminole War ends, with the Seminoles forced from Florida.
1848 – Oregon Territory is organized by act of Congress.
1880 – Construction of Cologne Cathedral, the most famous landmark in Cologne, Germany, is completed.
1885 – Japan's first patent is issued to the inventor of a rust-proof paint.
1893 – France becomes the first country to introduce motor vehicle registration.
1900 – The Eight-Nation Alliance occupies Beijing, China, in a campaign to end the bloody Boxer Rebellion in China.

1901–present
1901 – The first claimed powered flight, by Gustave Whitehead in his Number 21.
1914 – World War I: Start of the Battle of Lorraine, an unsuccessful French offensive.
1917 – World War I: The Republic of China, which had heretofore been shipping labourers to Europe to assist in the war effort, officially declares war on the Central Powers, although it will continue to send to Europe labourers instead of combatants for the remaining duration of the war.
1920 – The 1920 Summer Olympics, having started four months earlier, officially open in Antwerp, Belgium, with the newly-adopted Olympic flag and the Olympic oath being raised and taken at the Opening Ceremony for the first time in Olympic history.
1921 – Tannu Uriankhai, later Tuvan People's Republic is established as a completely independent country (which is supported by Soviet Russia).
1933 – Loggers cause a forest fire in the Coast Range of Oregon, later known as the first forest fire of the Tillamook Burn;  destroying  of land.
1935 – Franklin D. Roosevelt signs the Social Security Act, creating a government pension system for the retired.
1936 – Rainey Bethea is hanged in Owensboro, Kentucky in the last known public execution in the United States.
1941 – World War II: Winston Churchill and Franklin D. Roosevelt sign the Atlantic Charter of war stating postwar aims.
1947 – Pakistan gains independence from the British Empire.
1959 – Founding and first official meeting of the American Football League.
1967 – UK Marine Broadcasting Offences Act declares participation in offshore pirate radio illegal.
1969 – The Troubles: British troops are deployed in Northern Ireland as political and sectarian violence breaks out, marking the start of the 37-year Operation Banner.
1971 – Bahrain declares independence from Britain.
1972 – An Ilyushin Il-62 airliner crashes near Königs Wusterhausen, East Germany killing 156 people.
1980 – Lech Wałęsa leads strikes at the Gdańsk, Poland shipyards.
1994 – Ilich Ramírez Sánchez, also known as "Carlos the Jackal", is captured.
1996 – Greek Cypriot refugee Solomos Solomou is shot and killed by a Turkish security officer while trying to climb a flagpole in order to remove a Turkish flag from its mast in the United Nations Buffer Zone in Cyprus.
2003 – A widescale power blackout affects the northeast United States and Canada.
2005 – Helios Airways Flight 522, en route from Larnaca, Cyprus to Prague, Czech Republic via Athens, crashes in the hills near Grammatiko, Greece, killing 121 passengers and crew.
2006 – Lebanon War: A ceasefire takes effect three days after the United Nations Security Council’s approval of United Nations Security Council Resolution 1701, formally ending hostilities between Lebanon and Israel.
2006 – Sri Lankan Civil War: Sixty-one schoolgirls killed in Chencholai bombing by Sri Lankan Air Force air strike.
2007 – The Kahtaniya bombings kills at least 500 people.
2013 – Egypt declares a state of emergency as security forces kill hundreds of demonstrators supporting former president Mohamed Morsi.
  2013   – UPS Airlines Flight 1354 crashes short of the runway at Birmingham–Shuttlesworth International Airport, killing both crew members on board.
2015 – The US Embassy in Havana, Cuba re-opens after 54 years of being closed when Cuba–United States relations were broken off.
2021 – A magnitude 7.2 earthquake strikes southwestern Haiti, killing at least 2,248 people and causing a humanitarian crisis.
2022 – An explosion destroys a market in Armenia, killing six people and injuring dozens.

Births

Pre-1600
1479 – Catherine of York (d. 1527)
1499 – John de Vere, 14th Earl of Oxford, English politician (d. 1526)
1502 – Pieter Coecke van Aelst, Flemish painter (d. 1550)
1530 – Giambattista Benedetti, Italian mathematician and physicist (d. 1590)
1552 – Paolo Sarpi, Italian writer (d. 1623)
1599 – Méric Casaubon, Swiss-English scholar and author (d. 1671)

1601–1900
1642 – Cosimo III de' Medici, Grand Duke of Tuscany (d. 1723)
1653 – Christopher Monck, 2nd Duke of Albemarle, English colonel and politician, Lieutenant Governor of Jamaica (d. 1688)
1688 – Frederick William I of Prussia (d. 1740)
1714 – Claude Joseph Vernet, French painter (d. 1789)
1738 – Leopold Hofmann, Austrian composer and conductor (d. 1793)
1742 – Pope Pius VII (d. 1823)
1758 – Carle Vernet, French painter and lithographer (d. 1836)
1777 – Hans Christian Ørsted, Danish physicist and chemist (d. 1851)
1802 – Letitia Elizabeth Landon, English poet and novelist (d. 1838)
1814 – Charlotte Fowler Wells, American phrenologist and publisher (d. 1901)
1817 – Alexander H. Bailey, American lawyer, judge, and politician (d. 1874)
1840 – Richard von Krafft-Ebing, German-Austrian psychologist and author (d. 1902)
1847 – Robert Comtesse, Swiss lawyer and politician (d. 1922)
1848 – Margaret Lindsay Huggins, Anglo-Irish astronomer and author (d. 1915)
1851 – Doc Holliday, American dentist and gambler (d. 1887)
1860 – Ernest Thompson Seton, American author, artist, and naturalist (d. 1946)
1863 – Ernest Thayer, American poet and author (d. 1940)
1865 – Guido Castelnuovo, Italian mathematician and academic (d. 1952)
1866 – Charles Jean de la Vallée-Poussin, Belgian mathematician and academic (d. 1962)
1867 – Cupid Childs, American baseball player (d. 1912)
  1867   – John Galsworthy,  English novelist and playwright, Nobel Prize laureate (d. 1933)
1871 – Guangxu Emperor of China (d. 1908)
1875 – Mstislav Dobuzhinsky, Russian-Lithuanian painter and illustrator (d. 1957)
1876 – Alexander I of Serbia (d. 1903)
1881 – Francis Ford, American actor, director, producer, and screenwriter (d. 1953)
1883 – Ernest Everett Just, American biologist and academic (d. 1941)
1886 – Arthur Jeffrey Dempster, Canadian-American physicist and academic (d. 1950)
1889 – Otto Tief, Estonian lawyer and politician, Prime Minister of Estonia (d. 1976)
1890 – Bruno Tesch, German chemist and businessman (d. 1946)
1892 – Kaikhosru Shapurji Sorabji, English pianist, composer, and critic (d. 1988)
1894 – Frank Burge, Australian rugby league player and coach (d. 1958)
1895 – Jack Gregory, Australian cricketer (d. 1973)
  1895   – Amaza Lee Meredith, American architect (d. 1984)
1896 – Albert Ball, English fighter pilot (d. 1917)
  1896   – Theodor Luts, Estonian director and cinematographer (d. 1980)
1900 – Margret Boveri, German journalist (d. 1975)

1901–present
1910 – Nüzhet Gökdoğan, Turkish astronomer and mathematician (d. 2003)
  1910   – Willy Ronis, French photographer (d. 2009)
  1910   – Pierre Schaeffer, French composer and producer (d. 1995)
1912 – Frank Oppenheimer, American physicist and academic (d. 1985)
1913 – Hector Crawford, Australian director and producer (d. 1991)
  1913   – Paul Dean, American baseball player (d. 1981)
1914 – Herman Branson, American physicist, chemist, and academic (d. 1995)
1915 – B. A. Santamaria, Australian political activist and publisher (d. 1998)
1916 – Frank and John Craighead, American naturalists (twins, Frank d. 2001, John d. 2016)
  1916   – Wellington Mara, American businessman (d. 2005)
1923 – Alice Ghostley, American actress (d. 2007)
1924 – Sverre Fehn, Norwegian architect, designed the Hedmark Museum (d. 2009)
  1924   – Georges Prêtre, French conductor (d. 2017)
1925 – Russell Baker, American critic and essayist (d. 2019)
1926 – René Goscinny, French author and illustrator (d. 1977)
  1926   – Buddy Greco, American singer and pianist (d. 2017)
1928 – Lina Wertmüller, Italian director and screenwriter (d. 2021)
1929 – Giacomo Capuzzi, Italian Roman Catholic prelate, bishop of the Roman Catholic Diocese of Lodi from 1989 to 2005 (d. 2021).
  1929   – Dick Tiger, Nigerian boxer (d. 1971)
1930 – Arthur Latham, British politician and Member of Parliament (d. 2016)
  1930   – Earl Weaver, American baseball player and manager (d. 2013)
1931 – Frederic Raphael, American journalist, author, and screenwriter
1932 – Lee Hoffman, American author (d. 2007)
1933 – Richard R. Ernst, Swiss chemist and academic, Nobel Prize laureate (d. 2021)
1935 – John Brodie, American football player
1938 – Bennie Muller, Dutch footballer
1941 – David Crosby, American singer-songwriter and guitarist (d. 2023)
  1941   – Connie Smith, American country music singer-songwriter and guitarist
1942 – Willie Dunn, Canadian singer-songwriter and producer (d. 2013)
1943 – Ronnie Campbell, English miner and politician
  1943   – Ben Sidran, American jazz and rock keyboardist
1945 – Steve Martin, American actor, comedian, musician, producer, and screenwriter
  1945   – Wim Wenders, German director, producer, and screenwriter
1946 – Larry Graham, American soul/funk bass player and singer-songwriter
  1946   – Susan Saint James, American actress
  1946   – Tom Walkinshaw, Scottish race car driver and businessman (d. 2010)
1947 – Maddy Prior, English folk singer
  1947   – Danielle Steel, American author
  1947   – Joop van Daele, Dutch footballer
1949 – Morten Olsen, Danish footballer
1950 – Gary Larson, American cartoonist
1951 – Slim Dunlap, American singer-songwriter and guitarist
1952 – Debbie Meyer, American swimmer
1953 – James Horner, American composer and conductor (d. 2015)
1954 – Mark Fidrych, American baseball player and sportscaster (d. 2009)
  1954   – Stanley A. McChrystal, American general
1956 – Jackée Harry, American actress and television personality
  1956   – Andy King, English footballer and manager (d. 2015)
  1956   – Rusty Wallace, American race car driver
1957 – Peter Costello, Australian lawyer and politician
1959 – Frank Brickowski, American basketball player
  1959   – Marcia Gay Harden, American actress
  1959   – Magic Johnson, American basketball player and coach
1960 – Sarah Brightman, English singer and actress
  1960   – Fred Roberts, American basketball player
1962 – Mark Gubicza, American baseball player
1963 – José Cóceres, Argentinian golfer
1964 – Neal Anderson, American football player and coach
  1964   – Jason Dunstall, Australian footballer
1965 – Paul Broadhurst, English golfer
1966 – Halle Berry, American model, actress, and producer
  1966   – Karl Petter Løken, Swedish-Norwegian footballer
1968 – Catherine Bell, English-American actress and producer
  1968   – Darren Clarke, Northern Irish golfer
  1968   – Jason Leonard, English rugby player
1969 – Tracy Caldwell Dyson, American chemist and astronaut
  1969   – Stig Tøfting, Danish footballer
1970 – Kevin Cadogan, American rock guitarist
1971 – Raoul Bova, Italian actor, producer, and screenwriter
  1971   – Benito Carbone, Italian footballer
  1971   – Peter Franzén, Finnish actor
  1971   – Mark Loretta, American baseball player
1972 – Laurent Lamothe, Haitian businessman and politician, Prime Minister of Haiti
1973 – Jared Borgetti, Mexican footballer
  1973   – Kieren Perkins, Australian swimmer
1974 – Chucky Atkins, American basketball player
1975 – Mike Vrabel, American football player
1976 – Fabrizio Donato, Italian triple jumper
1977 – Juan Pierre, American baseball player
1978 – Anastasios Kyriakos, Greek footballer
  1978   – Greg Rawlinson, New Zealand rugby player
1979 – Paul Burgess, Australian pole vaulter
1980 – Peter Malinauskas, Australian politician, 47th Premier of South Australia
1981 – Earl Barron, American basketball player
  1981   – Paul Gallen, Australian rugby league player, boxer, and sportscaster
  1981   – Julius Jones, American football player
  1981   – Scott Lipsky, American tennis player
1983 – Elena Baltacha, Ukrainian-Scottish tennis player (d. 2014)
  1983   – Mila Kunis, Ukrainian-American actress
1984 – Eva Birnerová, Czech tennis player
  1984   – Clay Buchholz, American baseball player
  1984   – Giorgio Chiellini, Italian footballer
  1984   – Josh Gorges, Canadian ice hockey player
  1984   – Nick Grimshaw, English radio and television host
  1984   – Nicola Slater, Scottish tennis player
  1984   – Robin Söderling, Swedish tennis player
1985 – Christian Gentner, German footballer
  1985   – Shea Weber, Canadian ice hockey player
1986 – Braian Rodríguez, Uruguayan footballer
1987 – Tim Tebow, American football and baseball player and sportscaster
1989 – Ander Herrera, Spanish footballer
  1989   – Kyle Turris, Canadian ice hockey player
1991 – Richard Freitag, German ski jumper
1991 – Giovanny Gallegos, Mexican baseball player 
1995 – Léolia Jeanjean, French tennis player
1997 – Greet Minnen, Belgian tennis player

Deaths

Pre-1600
 582 – Tiberius II Constantine, Byzantine emperor
1040 – Duncan I of Scotland
1167 – Rainald of Dassel, Italian archbishop
1204 – Minamoto no Yoriie, second Shōgun of the Kamakura shogunate
1433 – John I of Portugal (b. 1357)
1464 – Pope Pius II (b. 1405)
1573 – Saitō Tatsuoki, Japanese daimyō (b. 1548)

1601–1900
1691 – Richard Talbot, 1st Earl of Tyrconnell, Irish soldier and politician (b. 1630)
1716 – Madre María Rosa, Capuchin nun from Spain, to Peru (b. 1660)
1727 – William Croft, English organist and composer (b. 1678)
1774 – Johann Jakob Reiske, German physician and scholar (b. 1716)
1784 – Nathaniel Hone the Elder, Irish-born English painter and academic (b. 1718)
1852 – Margaret Taylor, First Lady of the United States (b. 1788)
1854 – Carl Carl, Polish-born actor and theatre director (b. 1787)
1860 – André Marie Constant Duméril, French zoologist and entomologist (b. 1774)
1870 – David Farragut, American admiral (b. 1801)
1890 – Michael J. McGivney, American priest, founded the Knights of Columbus (b. 1852)
1891 – Sarah Childress Polk, First Lady of the United States (b. 1803)

1901–present
1905 – Simeon Solomon, English soldier and painter (b. 1840)
1909 – William Stanley, British engineer and author (b. 1829)
1922 – Rebecca Cole, American physician and social reformer (b. 1846) 
1928 – Klabund, German author and poet (b. 1890)
1938 – Hugh Trumble, Australian cricketer and accountant (b. 1876)
1941 – Maximilian Kolbe, Polish martyr and saint (b. 1894)
  1941   – Paul Sabatier, French chemist and academic, Nobel Prize laureate (b. 1854)
1943 – Joe Kelley, American baseball player and manager (b. 1871)
1951 – William Randolph Hearst, American publisher and politician, founded the Hearst Corporation (b. 1863)
1954 – Hugo Eckener, German pilot and designer (b. 1868)
1955 – Herbert Putnam, American lawyer and publisher, Librarian of Congress (b. 1861)
1956 – Bertolt Brecht, German poet, playwright, and director (b. 1898)
  1956   – Konstantin von Neurath, German lawyer and politician, Reich Minister of Foreign Affairs (b. 1873)
1958 – Frédéric Joliot-Curie, French physicist and chemist, Nobel Prize laureate (b. 1900)
1963 – Clifford Odets, American director, playwright, and screenwriter (b. 1906)
1964 – Johnny Burnette, American singer-songwriter (b. 1934)
1965 – Vello Kaaristo, Estonian skier (b. 1911)
1967 – Bob Anderson, English motorcycle racer and race car driver (b. 1931)
1972 – Oscar Levant, American actor, pianist, and composer (b. 1906)
  1972   – Jules Romains, French author and poet (b. 1885)
1973 – Fred Gipson, American journalist and author (b. 1908)
1978 – Nicolas Bentley, English author and illustrator (b. 1907)
1980 – Dorothy Stratten, Canadian-American model and actress (b. 1960)
1981 – Karl Böhm, Austrian conductor and director (b. 1894)
  1981   – Dudley Nourse, South African cricketer (b. 1910)
1982 – Mahasi Sayadaw, Burmese monk and philosopher (b. 1904)
1984 – Spud Davis, American baseball player, coach, and manager (b. 1904)
  1984   – J. B. Priestley, English novelist and playwright (b. 1894)
1985 – Gale Sondergaard, American actress (b. 1899)
1988 – Roy Buchanan, American singer-songwriter and guitarist (b. 1939)
  1988   – Robert Calvert, South African-English singer-songwriter and playwright (b. 1945)
  1988   – Enzo Ferrari, Italian race car driver and businessman, founded Ferrari (b. 1898)
1991 – Alberto Crespo, Argentinian race car driver (b. 1920)
1992 – John Sirica, American lawyer and judge (b. 1904)
1994 – Elias Canetti, Bulgarian-Swiss author, Nobel Prize laureate (b. 1905)
  1994   – Alice Childress, American actress, playwright, and author (b. 1912)
1996 – Sergiu Celibidache, Romanian conductor and composer (b. 1912)
1999 – Pee Wee Reese, American baseball player and sportscaster (b. 1918)
2002 – Larry Rivers, American painter and sculptor (b. 1923)
2003 – Helmut Rahn, German footballer (b. 1929)
2004 – Czesław Miłosz, Polish-born American novelist, essayist, and poet, Nobel Prize laureate (b. 1911)
  2004   – Trevor Skeet, New Zealand-English lawyer and politician (b. 1918)
2006 – Bruno Kirby, American actor (b. 1949)
2007 – Tikhon Khrennikov, Russian pianist and composer (b. 1913)
2010 – Herman Leonard, American photographer (b. 1923)
2012 – Vilasrao Deshmukh, Indian lawyer and politician, Chief Minister of Maharashtra (b. 1945)
  2012   – Svetozar Gligorić, Serbian chess player (b. 1923)
  2012   – Phyllis Thaxter, American actress (b. 1919)
2013 – Jack Germond, American journalist and author (b. 1928)
2014 – Leonard Fein, American journalist and academic, co-founded Moment Magazine (b. 1934)
  2014   – George V. Hansen, American politician (b. 1930)
2015 – Bob Johnston, American songwriter and producer (b. 1932)
2016 – Fyvush Finkel, American actor (b. 1922)
2018 – Jill Janus, American singer (b. 1975)
2019 – Polly Farmer, Australian footballer and coach (b. 1935)
2020 – Julian Bream, English classical guitarist and lutenist (b. 1933)
  2020   – Angela Buxton, British tennis player (b. 1934)
  2020   – James R. Thompson, American politician, Governor of Illinois (1977–91) (b. 1936)
  2021 - Michael Aung-Thwin, American historian and scholar of Burmese and Southeast Asian history (b. 1946)

Holidays and observances
Christian feast day:
Arnold of Soissons
Domingo Ibáñez de Erquicia
Eusebius of Rome
Jonathan Myrick Daniels (Episcopal Church)
Maximilian Kolbe
Falklands Day is the celebration of the first sighting of the Falkland Islands by John Davis in 1592.
Independence Day, celebrates the independence of Pakistan from the United Kingdom in 1947.
Partition Horrors Remembrance Day commemorates the victims and sufferings of people during the Partition of India in 1947.

References

External links

 
 
 

Days of the year
August